Vincent Crisanti (born 1953) is a Canadian politician who was elected to represent Ward 1 Etobicoke North on Toronto City Council following the 2022 municipal election. He previously represented a former ward by the same name from 2010 to 2018.

Political career

Early runs and 2010 election 
Crisanti ran unsuccessfully in the 1997 municipal election for councillor in Ward 5, Rexdale Thistletown. Crisanti ran again in both the 2000 municipal election and the 2003 municipal election for councillor for Ward 1 Etobicoke North losing both times to Suzan Hall; the first time by only 97 votes.

Crisanti successfully ran a fourth time for councillor for Ward 1 in the 2010 municipal election defeating Hall by 509 votes.

Toronto Transit Commission board 
On December 8, 2010 he was appointed to the Toronto Transit Commission (TTC) board by council.

Crisanti was one of five councillors removed from the TTC board by council in March 2012. He was one of five councillors on the TTC board who voted in 2012 to terminate the services of the TTC General Manager Gary Webster.

Andy Byford was hired as Webster's replacement. As a result of the decision to terminate Webster, the five councillors who supported Webster's termination and his replacement by Byford, including Crisanti, were removed from the TTC board by council on March 5, 2012 before the end of their appointed term as a result of a motion by Councillor Karen Stintz, who was Chair of the TTC board.

Crisanti was re-elected as councillor for Ward 1 in the 2014 municipal election, and he was appointed again to the TTC board after the election of Mayor John Tory. Under Byford's leadership the TTC subsequently won the 2017 American Public Transportation Association's (APTA) award for Transit System of the Year.

Deputy mayor 
Crisanti was named a deputy mayor of Toronto by John Tory on December 1, 2014.

On September 8, 2017, at the "Ford Fest" BQQ event where Doug Ford announced his candidacy for mayor of Toronto in 2018, Crisanti was quoted as publicly saying “If anybody out there doubts the power of Ford Nation, just come here tonight … I got first elected in 2010 with the support of Rob Ford and I’m here today because of the Fords and I want to thank them.” As a result of Crisanti's statement, which was interpreted as support for Doug Ford's candidacy for mayor in the 2018 municipal election, John Tory removed Crisanti as deputy mayor, replacing him with Stephen Holyday.

2018 election 
Crisanti stood for re-election to Toronto City Council in the 2018 municipal election in the newly expanded Ward 1 Etobicoke North, created as a result of the Toronto ward boundary changes imposed by the Ontario government of Doug Ford. The new Ward 1 had the same boundaries as the federal and provincial ridings. In the campaign, Premier Ford announced his support for his nephew Michael Ford, to whom Crisanti would lose.

2022 election 
Crisanti was elected as councillor for Etobicoke North in October 2022, the first councillor for the ward since 1997 who was not related to the Ford family.

Electoral history

References

External links 
 
 

1953 births
Living people
Canadian people of Italian descent
People from Etobicoke
Toronto city councillors